Brother J (born Jason Hunter) is an American hip hop artist and is a member of the American hip hop group X Clan, which used to include Professor X the Overseer, Paradise the Architect, and Sugar Shaft. He shares his civilian first and last name with Inspectah Deck.

In 2016, Design & Trend magazine named him as one of the 10 Greatest Conscious Rappers of All Time.

See also

 Political hip hop
 Black nationalism
 Afrocentricity

References

External links 
 X Clan Music (X Clan official Web site)

African-American poets
African-American rappers
English-language poets
Island Records artists
Rappers from Brooklyn
1971 births
Living people
21st-century American rappers
21st-century American poets
21st-century African-American writers
20th-century African-American people